The copyright law of South Africa governs copyright, the right to control the use and distribution of artistic and creative works, in the Republic of South Africa. It is embodied in the Copyright Act, 1978 and its various amendment acts, and administered by the Companies and Intellectual Property Commission in the Department of Trade and Industry. As of March 2019 a major amendment to the law in the Copyright Amendment Bill has been approved by the South African Parliament and is awaiting signature by the President.

South Africa is a party to the Berne Convention and the TRIPS Agreement. It has signed, but not ratified, the WIPO Copyright Treaty WIPO Performances and Phonograms Treaty and the Marrakesh Treaty.

History
Initially, after the creation of the Union of South Africa in 1910, the copyright laws of the four formerly-independent provinces continued unchanged. In 1916, Parliament enacted the Patents, Designs, Trade Marks and Copyright Act, 1916, which repealed the various provincial laws and incorporated the British Imperial Copyright Act 1911 into South African law. In 1928, along with the other British dominions, South Africa became a party to the Berne Convention in its own right.

After South Africa became a republic in 1961, Parliament enacted its own copyright law, separate from that of the United Kingdom, in the Copyright Act, 1965. Nonetheless, this act was largely based on the British Copyright Act 1956. In 1978 it was replaced by the Copyright Act, 1978, which (as amended) remains in force. The 1978 Act draws both from British law and from the text of the Berne Convention. It has been amended several times, most notably in 1992 to make computer programs a distinct class of protected work, and in 1997 to bring it into line with the TRIPS agreement.

In September 2021, the Gauteng High Court that the 1978 Copyright Act is unconstitutional because it does not give adequate freedom for blind and visually impaired readers to translate a work into Braille or other accessible formats, and hence discriminates against people with visual impairment. The plaintiff, the nonprofit organisation Blind SA, estimated that fewer than 0.5% of published books are available in Braille. The Parliament was given 24 months to make the required amendments to the Copyright Act. Blind SA will bring the case toward the Constitutional Court of South Africa for confirmation in May 2022, and seeks to make the read-in of the proposed amendment be made permanent after 12 months if Parliament does not implement the required amendment. Copyright lawyer Owen Dean has criticised the ruling because it is overly broad and argued that the Copyright Act does make such an exception, but said that the law uses outdated language and framework. The Minister of Trade, Industry and Competition criticised the proposed remedy from the 2022 ruling as violating separation of powers.

Eligibility for copyright
The Copyright Act defines nine classes of work that are eligible for copyright:
 literary works - including novels, poems, plays, film scripts, textbooks, articles, encyclopedias, reports, speeches, etc.
 musical works - excluding words sung with the music
 artistic works - including paintings, sculptures, drawings, photographs, architectural works, works of craftsmanship, etc.
 cinematograph films - in any medium, including film, tape or digital data
 sound recordings - in any medium, but excluding film soundtracks
 broadcasts - signals transmitted by radio waves and intended for public reception
programme-carrying signals - signals representing audio and/or video and transmitted via satellite
 published editions - particular typographical arrangements of literary or musical works
 computer programs - instructions, in any medium, that direct the operation of a computer

For a work to be eligible for copyright, it must be original, and it must have been written down or recorded in some way (except for broadcasts and programme-carrying signals, which must have been broadcast or transmitted, respectively). "Originality" requires the work to have been produced by the exercise of skill and effort by the author(s). As in all Berne Convention countries, copyright is automatic and does not require registration.

The Copyright Act automatically protects works created by South Africans or in South Africa. It also permits the Minister of Trade and Industry to extend the same protection to works created in, or by residents of, other countries; such protection has been extended to all Berne Convention countries.

Copyright term
For literary, musical and artistic works, except for photographs, the copyright term in South Africa is fifty years from the end of the year of the author's death, or fifty years from publication if it is first published after the author's death. For photographs, films and computer programs, the term is fifty years from first publication, or fifty years from creation if not published within fifty years. For sound recordings, broadcasts, programme-carrying signals and published editions, it is fifty years from first publication or transmission.

Anonymous works are protected for the shorter of fifty years from first publication or fifty years from the year when it is reasonable to presume the author is dead. For works with multiple authors, the fifty years from death are calculated from the death of the last author to die. Government works are protected for fifty years from first publication.

Commissioned Works 
Generally, ownership of a protected work vests in the author of the work. Section 21(1)(c) of the Act, however, creates a statutory default vesting copyright in certain works in the party commissioning the work rather than in the author.  

Section 21(1)(c) states: "(c) Where a person commissions the taking of a photograph, the painting or drawing of a portrait, the making of a gravure, the making of a cinematograph film or the making of a sound recording and pays or agrees to pay for it in money or money's worth, and the work is made in pursuance of that commission, such person shall, subject to the provisions of paragraph (b), be the owner of any copyright subsisting therein by virtue of section 3 or 4."

Limitations and Exceptions 
The exclusive rights granted by copyright are subject to specific and general limitations and exceptions permitting certain uses of works without permission of the rights holder.

Fair Dealing 
Like most Commonwealth countries with a legal system derived from UK law, the South African Copyright Act contains a general exception for "fair dealing" with a copyrighted work. The word "dealing" means the same as "use" -- it applies to any use of a work that falls within the section's permitted purposes as long as that use is "fair." In this sense, both South African "fair dealing" and US and other "fair use" rights are the same.  

The key difference between the US fair use general exception and the fair dealing right of South Africa is that the latter is applicable only to a specified list of purposes. The US right lists a similar set of purposes preceded by the opening clause "such as." 
Section 12(1) of the Act states:"12.- (1) Copyright shall not be infringed by any fair dealing with a literary or musical work-

(a) for the purposes of research or private study by, or the personal or private use of, the person using the work;

(b) for the purposes of criticism or review of that work or of another work; or

(c) for the purpose of reporting current events-

(i) in a newspaper, magazine or similar periodical; or

(ii) by means of broadcasting or in a cinematograph film:

Provided that, in the case of paragraphs (b) and (c)(i), the source shall be mentioned, as well as the name of the author if it appears on the work."The fair dealing right is a flexible standard that turns on a balancing test to determine what is a "fair" dealing. Unlike some fair dealing and fair use rights, the factors determining what is a "fair" dealing is not defined in the Act. South African courts, however, have generally applied the same four factors as provided in the U.S. fair use right and many fair dealing statutes. 

The fair dealing clause originally applied only to the use of a “literary or musical work”. The provision was later extended to films and sound recordings by the addition of sections 16 and 17. But these extensions only applied to the purposes listed in 12(1)(b) and (1)(c), i.e., for the purpose of “criticism or review” or “reporting current events”. Thus, there is no fair dealing right to make a fair dealing of an audiovisual work "for the purposes of research or private study by, or the personal or private use of, the person using the work."  

In addition to the general fair dealing right, South Africa has a number of specific limitations and exceptions.

Quotation 
Section 12(3) states: "The copyright […] shall not be infringed by any quotation therefrom, including any quotation from articles in newspapers or periodicals that are in the form of summaries of any such work: Provided that the quotation shall be compatible with fair practice, that the extent thereof shall not exceed the extent justified by the purpose and that the source shall be mentioned, as well as the name of the author if it appears on the work."The South African quotation right is notable in being open to a quotation for any purpose. This is an attribute of the U.S. "fair use" right. But unlike fair use, the quotation right can only apply to an extract of a work -- not to use of a full work, such as a photograph.

Illustration for Teaching 
Section 12(4) provides for an exception for use of copyrighted work “by way of illustration […] for teaching”: "The copyright in a literary or musical work shall not be infringed by using such work, to the extent justified by the purpose, by way of illustration in any publication, broadcast or sound or visual record for teaching: Provided that such use shall be compatible with fair practice and that the source shall be mentioned, as well as the name of the author if it appears on the work."

Incidental Use 
Section 15(1) states: "15(1) The copyright in an artistic work shall not be infringed by its inclusion in a cinematograph film or a television broadcast or transmission in a diffusion service, if such inclusion is merely by way of background, or incidental, to the principal matters represented in the film, broadcast or transmission."This right is limited to the capture of “an artistic work” in certain other works.  

Section 1 of the Act defines “artistic work” narrowly, as including “(a) paintings, sculptures, drawings, engravings and photographs; (b) works of architecture, being either buildings or models of buildings; or (c) works of craftsmanship […]”. Thus, the incidental use right would permit the filming of a building or sculpture in the background of a scene. But the definition in section 1 excludes music, film or broadcast footage, as well as literary texts.  It would not authorize the capture of music playing on a radio, a programme playing on a television set, or even the capture of a literary text such as an open book -- because these works are not defined as "an artistic work."  

The right only applies if the captured work is "by way of background, or incidental, to the principal matters represented." It thus would appear to permit the capture of works in the background of a film, but not the direct filming of works in public places.  

Finally, the right allows the incidental capture only of specified works. The work using the right must be "a cinematograph film or a television broadcast or transmission in a diffusion service."  

A diffusion service is defined in section 1(1) as  "a telecommunication service of transmissions consisting of sounds, images, signs or signals, which takes place over wires or other paths provided by material substance and intended for reception by specific members of the public; and diffusion shall not be deemed to constitute a performance or a broadcast or as causing sounds, images, signs or signals to be seen or heard; and where sounds, images, signs or signals are displayed or emitted by any receiving apparatus to which they are conveyed by diffusion in such manner as to constitute a performance or a causing of sounds, images, signs or signals to be seen or heard in public, this shall be deemed to be effected by the operation of the receiving apparatus." The definition of works using the right does not include photographs. Thus, there is no freedom of panorama right in South Africa that would permit photographs of artistic works to be taken without infringing the copyright in the works.

Copyright Policy Reviews

South Africa’s National Research and Development Strategy (2002) 
A review of South Africa's research and development strategy reported on the “net cost” of copyright and royalties to South Africa as rising from R200 million to R800 million between 1990 and 2002.

Copyright Review Commission (2011) 
In 2011, the Copyright Review Commission published its report on amendments to the Copyright Act needed to promote the interests of musicians. The Report recommended that the law be amended to protect the “needle time” rights of performers whose music is broadcast, that a right of communication to the public be adopted, that unfair contracts be regulated, that excessive costs and unfair practices of collective management organizations be controlled, that copyrights revert to the creator after 25 years, and that the Copyright Tribunal be streamlined.

Draft Intellectual Property Policy 2013 
In 2013, the Department of Trade and Industry published a Draft Intellectual Property Policy. The Policy included the following discussion of copyright policy:"While some developing countries have benefited from the copyright regime, others have not (WIPO Studies and Commission). Many developing countries have joined international treaties in the copyright area, but can hardly show benefits that flow from such treaties. Equally, other developing countries have shown that they enforce strictly copyright regime and their resources (finance, police, border policing, restrictive internet/technological devices), but they are unable to quantify whether the costs of enforcement outweigh economic benefits that flow from the copyright-based industries. There are treaties or conventions that give nations flexibilities in copyright to allow copying, in particular for education and personal use. These flexibilities are commonly known as "fair use" or "fair dealing" in various jurisdictions. Notwithstanding the availability of these flexibilities, developing nations are of the view that these flexibilities do not cover their needs, in particular in the area of education.

It is submitted that an inevitable impact of stronger protection and enforcement in terms of the TRIPS Agreement leads to reducing access to knowledge-related products in developing countries, thus poor people are exposed to damaging consequences."Its core recommendations included:“To  enhance  access  to  copyrighted  materials  and  achieve  developmental  goals  for  education and  knowledge  transfer,  South  Africa  must  adopt  pro-competitive  measures  under  copyright legislation. The legislation must provide the maintenance and adoption of broad exemptions for educational, research and library uses.

. . . 

South Africa internet users must be entitled to fair use rights such as making and distributing copies from electronic sources in reasonable numbers for educational and research purposes and using reasonable excerpts in commentary and criticism.”

Intellectual Property Impact Assessment (2014) 
An assessment of the Intellectual Property Policy was commissioned for the Department of Trade Industry, conducted by Genesis Analytics, The report advocated for the incorporation of a general fair use provision, allowances for the utilisation of whole works for teaching without limitations to the types and forms of that utilisation, extending the copyright exceptions to all types of education, and removing restrictions on the number of copies for educational purposes that can be made of a work.

References

Smit & Van Wyk, Inc. Copyright Law in South Africa - http://www.svw.co.za/copyright

External links

 Companies and Intellectual Property Commission

South Africa
South African intellectual property law